George Anson Bruce (November 19, 1839 – January 31, 1929) was an American politician who served as a member of the New Hampshire House of Representatives, on the Board of Aldermen and as the fourth Mayor of Somerville, Massachusetts; and as a member, and President of, the Massachusetts Senate.

Early life
Bruce was born to Nathaniel and Lucy (Butterfield) Bruce in Mont Vernon, New Hampshire on November 19, 1839.

Family
Bruce married Clara M. Hall of Groton, Massachusetts, they had one daughter, Clara Augusta, who was born November 19, 1882.

George A. Bruce died in Brookline, Massachusetts on January 31, 1929, at 89 years of age..

Writings
 The capture and occupation of Richmond (1900).
 twentieth regiment of Massachusetts volunteer infantry, 1861-1865'' (1906).

See also
 105th Massachusetts General Court (1884)

Notes

External links
 George Anson BRUCE

1839 births
1929 deaths
People from Mont Vernon, New Hampshire
Members of the New Hampshire House of Representatives
Massachusetts state senators
Presidents of the Massachusetts Senate
Mayors of Somerville, Massachusetts
People of Massachusetts in the American Civil War
Dartmouth College alumni